The Ambassador Extraordinary and Plenipotentiary of Ukraine to Austria is the ambassador of Ukraine to Austria. The current ambassador is Oleksandr Shcherba. He assumed the position in 17 November 2014.

The first Ukrainian ambassador to Austria assumed his post in 1918, the same year a Ukrainian embassy opened in Vienna.

List of representatives

Ukrainian People's Republic
 1918–1918 Andriy Yakovliv
 1918–1919 Vyacheslav Lypynsky
 1919–1921 Hryhoriy Sydorenko
 1921–1921 Mykola Zaliznyak

Ukrainian Soviet Socialist Republic
 1921–1922 Yuriy Kotsiubynsky (important representative)
 1922–1922 Hryhoriy Besyedovsky (government delegate)
 1922–1923 Dmitriy Bogomolov (1st secretary)

Ukraine
 1992–1994 Yurii V. Kostenko
 1994–1999 Mykola Makarevych
 1999–2004 Volodymyr Ohryzko
 2004–2005 Yuriy Polurez
 2005–2007 Volodymyr Yelchenko
 2007–2008 Vadym Kostyuk (provisional)
 2008–2010 Yevhen Chornobryvko
 2010–2010 Vasyl Kyrylych (provisional)
 2010–2014 Andriy Bereznyi
 Since 2014 Oleksandr Shcherba

See also 
 Ukrainian Embassy, Vienna
 Ambassador of Austria to Ukraine

References

External links 
  Embassy of Ukraine to Austria: Previous Ambassadors

 
Austria
Ukraine